The 1909 Ohio Green and White football team represented Ohio University  as an independent during the 1909 college football season. Led by first-year head coach Robert Wood, the Green and White compiled a record of 2–4–2.

Schedule

References

Ohio
Ohio Bobcats football seasons
Ohio Green and White football